Specialty Equipment Market Association (SEMA) of the automobile aftermarket was formed in 1963 by Roy Richter, Ed Iskenderian, Els Lohn, Willie Garner, Bob Hedman, Robert E. Wyman, John Bartlett, Phil Weiand Jr, Al Segal, Dean Moon, and Vic Edelbrock Jr. and now consists of 6,383 companies worldwide, bringing together aftermarket manufacturers, original equipment manufacturers (OEM), media, car dealers, specialty equipment distributors, installers, retailers and restoration specialists.

The largest of the SEMA events held annually during the first week of November is the SEMA Show at the Las Vegas Convention Center in Las Vegas, Nevada in conjunction with the Automotive Aftermarket Industry Week. As part of this event, SEMA and other automotive aftermarket trade groups make up one of the single largest events on the Las Vegas calendar. This auto show is not open to the public. Registration as media, manufacturer, buyer or exhibitor is required. 

On August 5th, 2020, SEMA announced that its 2020 show would be cancelled for the first time in the show's history, due to the COVID-19 pandemic.

History

The SEMA acronym originally stood for Speed Equipment Manufacturing Association. In 1970, government regulations became an issue and the name was changed to Specialty Equipment Market Association to improve the overall image of the association. It was also warned that bureaucrats in the industry may be turned off by the word "speed," which Corporate Council Earl Kitner felt they may associate with "the swinging generation." SEMA came about as a result of the company Revell Models attempting to fill a gap in industry trade regulation. Its first president was Ed Iskenderian. Other original members of the organization include Roy Richter, Willie Garner, Bob Hedman, Robert E. Wyman, Paul Schiefer, John Bartlett, Phil Weiand Jr., Al Segal, Dean Moon, and Vic Edelbrock Jr. 

Founding members of SEMA

SEMA Show

The SEMA Show is held at the Las Vegas Convention Center. It is among the largest conventions held in Vegas. The 2013 SEMA Show drew about 60,000 buyers. The displays are segmented into 12 sections, and a New Products Showcase features nearly 2,000 newly introduced parts, tools and components. In addition, the SEMA Show provides attendees with educational seminars, product demonstrations, special events, networking opportunities and more.

The first SEMA Show was held in 1967 in the basement of the Dodger Stadium in Los Angeles, before moving to the new Anaheim Stadium in 1974. In 1967 they had 98 manufacturers manning booths and an attendance of 3,000 people. In 1967 there were 5 cars on display, including a 1967 Ford GT40 in the Shelby America booth and a drag-race-prepped Dodge Dart. The early shows, held in Los Angeles and Anaheim, California, were exclusively card-table-and-masking-tape affairs, but by the early 1970s, sophisticated display and marketing techniques were visible throughout the show. At that time, a Show booth cost $375. The Show moved to a different location—the new and expansive Anaheim Convention Center (across from Disneyland). Booth sales and attendance kept increasing dramatically. The SEMA Show continued to cater to the needs of industry representatives rather than consumers and began to develop a reputation as a place where business was expected and completed. As part of the ’70s SEMA Shows, one of the must-attend events was Doris Herbert's Drag News party, which was topped only by the SEMA Awards Banquet.

In 1975, the featured entertainers for the Awards Banquet were April Stevens and Nino Tempo. In 1976 (the last SEMA Show to be held in Anaheim), the show was a sellout with 570 booths and, in fact, had to turn away a number of manufacturers due to lack of space. Over the next few years, the Show grew much larger and soon filled the Convention Center to capacity and was moved to Las Vegas in 1977. Las Vegas was chosen because it provided room for continued growth, dependable weather, big-name entertainment and a world-famous location.

In 1977, SEMA's Awards Banquet (run by Sheldon Konblett) was held at the Sands Hotel and featured Norm Crosby. Sheldon Konblett also developed the design for the SEMA trophies, which have come to symbolize product innovation and excellence in the industry.

In 1979, Nile Cornelison began plans for his Innovations Day seminars program, which has since become one of the major annual association programs. The following year, Innovations Day was a smashing success and featured Lee Iacocca as the keynote speaker. Never before had any activity held on the day prior to the Show's opening attracted anything near the more than 460 who attended. That same year, Willie Nelson was the featured entertainer for the SEMA Awards Banquet.

In 1983, the import parts section of the SEMA Show was added under the auspices of sister organization, Automotive International Association, thus changing the name to SEMA/AI Show. In 1984, there was a combined SEMA/AI/APAA Show in Las Vegas. The Industry Awards Banquet was held at the MGM Grand, and the entertainment was provided by The Platters and Gallagher. By all indications, the move to Las Vegas has been an overwhelming success. In 1986, Car and Driver magazine noted that the Show was a “...prime opportunity to monitor the West Coast car culture without breathing the smog or fighting the freeways.” That same year, Jay Leno made his first appearance on stage at the SEMA Show Industry Awards Banquet.

In 1990, the onsite registration fee was increased to $20. All exhibitors are eligible to submit an entry into the New Products Showcase at no cost. In 1992, the SEMA/AI Show and the Automotive Service Industry, Motor & Equipment Manufacturers Association and Automotive Parts & Accessories Association (ASIA/MEMA/APAA Show—formerly the Big I/APAA Show) came together to form Automotive Aftermarket Industry Week (AAIW) in Las Vegas. The two shows together boasted in excess of 1.6 million square feet of exhibits.

In 1997, the National Tire Dealers & Retreaters (NTDRA) trade show was combined with the SEMA Show. Affiliating the 77-year-old NTDRA trade show with the SEMA portion of AAIW provided benefits to both sides. In the same year, Goodyear sponsored the first SEMA-NTDRA “Racers’ Night Out” at the Las Vegas Motor Speedway.

In 1998, the SEMA Show broke the 500,000-foot mark with 502,912 net square feet of rented space. Each year since then, the Show has set new records of some sort. It now occupies more than one million net square feet, draws more than 3,000 media, and has a buyer attendance in excess of 60,000. The SEMA Show now routinely brings together more than 2,300 exhibitors, occupying in excess of 11,000 booths. Total attendance at the Show now tops 150,000 manufacturers, buyers and other industry representatives, making contacts and doing business.

1967

 Dodge Dart Drag Race Car
 Ford GT40
1967 Dodge Adventurer D100 Truck Parts

1984
 Chevrolet Camaro GTZ Concept
 Pontiac Fiero by IRM

1985
 Buick Wildcat Concept

1987
 Ford Bronco II Concept

1990
 Chevrolet Camaro B&M Neon

1991
 Chevrolet Camaro LT5 Concept
 Geo Tracker "Boom Box" Concept
 Geo "Zonker" Metro

1992
 Boyd Coddington Chezoom
 Chevrolet Highlander Concept
 Chevrolet Impala SS Concept

1993
 Callaway C8 SuperNatural
 Chevrolet Camaro by BBS Wheels 
 Chevrolet Camaro by RK Sport
 Chevrolet Camaro by Kobel
 Chevrolet Camaro by Pro Cut
 Chevrolet Camaro by Paxton

1994
 Chevrolet Blazer ZR2 Concept
 Chevrolet Cavalier Touring Sedan Concept
 Chevrolet NASCAR Super Truck
 Chevrolet Monte Carlo Sport Concept
 Chevrolet Lumina Super Sport Concept
 Chevrolet Ram Van Concept
 Chevrolet S-Series Wings Concept
 Geo Tracker Kalahari Concept
 Geo Tracker Outbacker Concept

1995
 Chevrolet Cavalier Spyder Concept
 Chevrolet Cavalier Z24
 Chevrolet Caprice "Fire & Rescue"
 Chevrolet Tahoe SS Concept
 Chevrolet Monte Carlo SS Concept
 Chevrolet Monte Car-Low "Lead Sled" Concept
 Chevrolet S-10 Elongate Concept
 Chevrolet S-10 Hugger Concept
 Dodge Ram VTS Concept
 Dodge Viper GTS Indy 500 Pace Car
 Ford Ranger Splash MATCO

1996

 Chevrolet 2500 by Innovative Truck Storage Inc.
 Chevrolet Impala SS "Binford Hot Rod"
 Chevrolet Tahoe Police Package Concept
 Chevrolet Tahoe SS Concept
 Chevrolet Camaro F1
 Chevrolet Camaro Z28 SS
 Chevrolet C-1500 Extended Cab
 Chevrolet C-1500 Regular Cab NASCAR Supertruck Series Pace Truck
 Chevrolet Silverado SuperWIDE Concept
 Chevrolet Camaro Z28 "30th Anniversary Edition"
 Chevrolet Camaro Z28 Convertible "30th Anniversary Edition"
 Chevrolet ZL2-Plus 4 Concept
 Chevrolet Cavalier ZR-24 MOAB Concept
 Dodge Dakota Sidewinder Concept
 Dodge T-Rex 6x6 Concept Truck
 Ford F-150 XP Concept Truck
 Ford Ranger SuperCab Concept
 Ford Ranger Sandcourt Concept
 Jeep Wrangler Tabasco Concept
 Jeep Wrangler Ultimate Rescue Concept
 Geo Rad Tracker Concept
 Hennessey Venom 600 GTS
 Nissan 240SX by HKS
 Mazda RX-7 A&L Racing
 Mitsubishi Eclipse by GReddy
 Pontiac Firebird by [[
Lingenfelter Performance Engineering|Lingenfelter]]
 Saleen Speedster
 Saleen Ford Mustang SR
 Shelby Series 1

1997
 Chevrolet S-10 Xtreme Force Concept
 Chevrolet Cavalier Z24 Technic Concept
 Chevrolet Corvette Convertible Indy 500 Pace Car
 Chevrolet Malibu Sport Concept
 Chevrolet Ski Van Concept
 Dodge Durango Super Pursuit
Dodge Sidewinder
 Ford F-150 Super Duty
 Ford F-250 Super Duty
 Ford F-350 Super Duty
 Ford F-450 Super Duty
 Ford F-550 Super Duty
 Ford "Baja Baby" Ranger Concept
 Ford Mustang GT Shinoda Boss
 Ford Mustang Super Stallion Concept
 Mitsubishi Eclipse GSX SCC Magazine

1998

 Buick Riviera Northstar Concept
 Chevrolet AdVenture Concept
 Chevrolet Blazer ZR-2 Shark Edition Convertible Concept
 Chevrolet Corvette C5R
 Chevrolet Camaro LS1 Dragster Super Performance
 Chevrolet Express Tool Time Van Concept
 Chevrolet Lone Star Suburban
 Chevrolet Silverado Greg Norman Hot Rod Concept
 Chevrolet Silverado Pace Truck
 Chevrolet Silverado Race Truck
 Chevrolet Silverado SS Concept
 Chevrolet Silverado Tonka Truck Concept
 Chevrolet Tahoe Limited
 Chevrolet Tahoe Police Package
 Chevrolet Tahoe Z71
 Chevrolet Tracker ZR-2 Concept
 Chevrolet Sterling Silverado Concept
 Chevrolet Venture Taxi
 Chrysler Sebring Convertible Allure Show Car
 Chrysler Sebring Convertible JXTRA Show Car
 Chrysler Sebring Convertible Seamist Show Car
 Chrysler Sebring Convertible Tech 27 Show Car
 Dodge Durango SP360 Carroll Shelby Edition
 Ford Expedition Himalaya Concept
 Ford Mustang Cobra SVT
 Ford Mustang Roush
 Ford F-650 Super Crewzer Concept
 Ford Ranger Duraliner
 Ford Taurus Rage Concept
 Ford TekSport Windstar Concept
 GMC Jimmy Typhoon II Concept
 GMC Sierra Modern Nostalgia 1-Les Jarvis Concept
 Honda CR-V King Motorsports
 Mercedes-Benz Millennium GLK Concept
 Mercury Cougar Eliminator Concept
 Mercury Cougar S Concept
 Mercury Gametime Villager Concept
 Mercury Marauder Concept
 Oldsmobile Silhouette Premiere
 Pontiac Grand Am SC/T Concept
 Toyota Supra TRD 2JZ

1999

 Buick Park Avenue "California"
 Chevrolet S-10 Baja Crew Cab Show Car
 Chevrolet S-10 V8 Xtreme Concept
 Chevrolet Blazer Xtreme Concept
 Chevrolet Cavalier Z24 Sedan
 Chevrolet Corvette C5 Cavallo GT
 Chevrolet Camaro ZL1 Concept
 Chevrolet Tandem 2000 Concept
 Chevrolet Tracker
 Chevrolet Tracker ZR2
 Chevrolet Silverado Extended Cab
 Chevrolet Suburban Z71 Concept
 Chrysler 300M Special Concept
 Chrysler GT Cruiser Concept
 Dodge Dakarta Concept
 Dodge Dakota Quad Cab "Discover" Concept
 Dodge Dakota SLT Quad Cab "Site Commander" Concept
 Dodge Dakota Quad Cab Fire Rescue Project Vehicle
 Dodge Dakota Quad Cab TSW Concept
 Dodge Dakota Super Extreme Concept
 Dodge Intrepid R/T
 Dodge Neon SRT Concept
 Ford Arctic Explorer Sport Trac Concept
 Ford Desert Excursion Concept
 Ford Excursion "Project Big Kahuna"
 Ford Expedition Eddie Bauer Edition "Desert Dancer"
 Ford Expedition SeaScape Concept
 Ford Galaxy Communicator
 Ford Focus R
 Ford Focus Woody Surfing Wagon
 Ford F-150 Rooster
 Ford F-150 Scuba SuperCrew Concept
 Ford F-150 Stillen
 Ford Mustang FR500 Concept
 Ford Ranger Thrillseeker
 Ford SVT Mustang Cobra R
 Ford Taurus Supercharged Concept
 Ford Trailmasters Explorer
 GMC Sierra Professional Concept
 Jeep Cherokee Africana Concept
 Mazda MX-5 Miata Mono-Posto Concept
 Mazda Protege StreetCar Concept
 Mercury Cougar S
 Navistar Turtle V
 Lincoln LS Special Concept
 Oldsmobile Aurora Indy 500 Pace Car
 Oldsmobile Alero OSV Concept
 Oldsmobile Intrigue OSV Concept
 Oldsmobile Silhouette OSV Concept
 Plymouth Howler Concept
 Plymouth Prowler Woodward Edition
 Pontiac Grand Prix GTP
 Toyota Tacoma Stepside

2000

 Acura CL Modified
 Acura MDX Modified
 Buick Park Avenue Ultra VIP Concept
 Buick Regal GNX Show Car
 Chevrolet 302 Camaro Concept
 Chevrolet Avalanche Base Camp Concept
 Chevrolet Bruin Fleet-Side Concept
 Chevrolet Silverado Coolside II Concept
 Chevrolet Silverado SS Concept
 Chevrolet Silverado HD 4X4 Crew Cab Fox Cycle Truck
 Chevrolet Suburban R/T Concept
 Chevrolet Tahoe Limited Concept
 Chevrolet Tahoe Z71 Concept
 Chevrolet S-10 T-Top Xtreme Concept
 Chevrolet S-10 ZZ4.3 Xtreme Concept
 Chrysler Brian Setzer Vavoom! Cruiser
 Chrysler PT Cruiser Delivery Sedan
 Chrysler Hot Rod PT Cruiser
 Chrysler "Futuristic Woody" PT Cruiser
 Chrysler Indian Cruiser
 Chrysler Paddy Cruiser
 Chrysler Rescue Cruiser
 Chrysler PT Rodder
 Chrysler PT Teaser
 Chrysler P Thompson River Cruiser 	
 Chrysler PT Cruiser Recaro Edition
 Chrysler PT Bruizer Concept
 Chrysler 300М Gran Turismo
 Dodge Neon SRT-4 Concept
 Dodge Hot Rod Stratus ("StatusFear")
 Dodge Stratus Sport Coupe Touring Classe Concept
 Dodge Ram HEMI Rumble Bee
 GMC Trucks TV Project Sierra
 GMC Sierra "Sportsider" AWD
 GMC Millennium Sierra
 GMC Sierra Specialty Trim
 GMC Sierra Victory Express
 GMC Downtown Sierra
 GMC Sierra Steelrunner
 GMC Sierra "Street Scene Special"
 GMC Sierra Inferno
 GMC Sierra Tremor
 GMC Sierra Cx Crew Cab Concept
 GMC Sonoma Recon Concept
 GMC Yukon XL Apex SUV
 Ford Crown Victoria Blackhawk Concept
 Ford SVT F-150 Lightning
 Ford Explorer Sport Trac Hot Rod
 Ford Explorer Sport Trac Extremist
 Ford Explorer "Baja 2000 Edition" Sport Trac
 Ford Line-X Explorer Sport Trac
 Ford Sport Trac "Urban Assault" Explorer
 Ford Borla's XSV Sport Trac
 Ford Bushwacker's Sport Trac
 Ford Escape XLT Sport
 Ford Great Escape
 Ford Focus FCV
 Ford Focus Flexus
 Ford Focus FR200 Concept
 Ford Focus "Made In Detroit" Concept
 Ford "Shaker" Mustang by Classic Design Concepts
 Ford Urban Explorer Concept
 Jeep Cherokee 8" Rock Ready Rescue by Skyjacker
 Jeep Grand Cherokee Kirkwood Edition (Jeep Colorado Concept)
 Jeep Grand Escape Limited
 Jeep Jamboree Wrangler TJ
 Jeep LWB 112 Wrangler
 Honda S2000 Modified
 Honda RASR Civic
 Hyundai Elantra GT by APC
 Hyundai Santa Fe by Today's SUV Magazine
 Hyundai Tiburon by Rimmer Performance
 Hyundai Tiburon Rally Car by Libra Racing
 Hyundai XG300 by Performance West
 Infiniti Q45 by Stillen
 Isuzu Amigo Bob Land Race Truck
 Isuzu ARB's Project Rodeo Sport
 Mazda Miata MM Concept
 Mazda Tribute MM Concept
 Mercury Cougar by Wings West
 Mitsubishi Montero Modified
 Nissan Frontier Crew Cab by Rockford Fosgate
 Nissan Frontier Crew Cab by Popular Mechanics Magazine
 Nissan Frontier Crew Cab by Street Trucks Magazine
 Nissan Frontier Crew Cab by Nissan Motorsports
 Nissan Frontier Crew Cab by Stockland Company
 Nissan Frontier Crew Cab by ArmorThane Coatings
 Nissan Frontier Crew Cab by AMP Research
 Nissan Frontier Crew Cab by Snugtop
 Nissan Frontier Crew Cab by JAC Products
 Nissan Xterra by Overlander Outfitters
 Nissan Xterra by Delta Lighting
 Nissan Xterra by GT Styling
 Nissan Xterra by HKS
 Nissan Xterra by American Racing Custom Wheels
 Nissan Xterra by Stillen
 Nissan Maxima SE by Eibach
 Nissan Maxima SE by Turbo & High-Tech Performance Magazine
 Nissan Maxima SE by MotoRex
 Nissan Maxima SE by Stillen
 Nissan Maxima SE PPG Pace Car
 Nissan Pathfinder by HKS
 Nissan Pathfinder by Hobrecht
 Lexus L-Tuned IS300 by TDR
 Oldsmobile Intrigue Saturday Night Cruiser Concept
 Pontiac Aztek Salsa
 Pontiac Bonneville SSEi Salt Flats Stock Class
 Pontiac Grand Prix G8 Concept
 Pontiac Grand Am SC/T Roadster Concept
 Pontiac Firebird Hurst Hauler Concept
 Pontiac Firebird MMS 421 Concept
 Pontiac Firebird Rytek Projektz Tranzam Concept
 Pontiac Montana Mobility Van
 Pontiac Montana Sunburst
 Pontiac Sunfire Youth Performance
 Pontiac Trans Am Bird of Prey Speedster
 Toyota bB Concept
 Toyota Camry Solara
 Toyota TRD Celica
 Toyota TRD MR2 Spyder
 Toyota TRD Tundra S/C Demos
 Toyota Tundra Moor Products
 Saab 9-3 Viggen Pikes Peak
 Saturn SC2 Concept
 Saturn LST Concept

2001

 Acura MDX Concept
 Acura RSX Concept
 Acura RSX Type-S CART Pace Car
 Acura RSX Type-S RO_JA Racing Pro Drag
 Acura RSX Type-S HKS Turbocharged
 Buick Rendezvous Mobility Concept
 Buick Rendezvous Tour Concept
 Cadillac Escalade Twin Turbo Concept
 Chevrolet Avalanche SS Eaton Torque Controls Products
 Chevrolet Cavalier 155 Maui Concept
 Chevrolet Cavalier 220 Sport Turbo Concept
 Chevrolet Cavalier 425 Drag Concept
 Chevrolet Cavalier 263 Super Sport Concept
 Chevrolet Cavalier Z24R Concept
 Chevrolet Corvette Coupe "Tiger Shark" Concept
 Chevrolet Malibu Cruiser Concept
 Chevrolet Monte Carlo Earnhardt Edition
 Chevrolet Silverado Pace Truck
 Chevrolet TrailBlazer Goin' Mobile
 Chrysler 300M Special
 Chrysler Lifestyle Vehicle Decoma PT/10
 Chrysler Pacifica Royal
 Chrysler Prowler Hard Top Concept
 Dodge Ram Rod Concept by Performance West
 Dodge Ram CGS Motorsports Sport Truck
 Dodge Ram Hunting Magazine Waterfowler Pursuit
 Dodge Ram Kenne Bell RH/R
 Ford 1956 Crown Victoria
 Ford A Whole New Focus
 Ford Boundless Escape
 Ford Eric Clapton's F-150
 Ford Explorer Extreme Luxury Sport Utility Vehicle
 Ford F-150 Wet n' Wild Supercrew
 Ford Focus NV
 Ford Harley-Davidson F-150 SuperCrew
 Ford Explorer Woodie
 Ford Mustang Titanium
 Ford Mustang Cobra Granatelli Motorsports/Summit Racing
 Ford Today and Tomorrow's Teenager Explorer Sport
 Ford Super Duty Power On Ice Concept
 Ford Ranger Back Country "Blast" Concept
 GMC C-Series Rollback Pro
 GMC Envoy Max
 GMC Envoy Pet Pro Concept
 GMC Savana Trekker Concept
 GMC Sierra Pro Plus Concept
 GMC Sonoma ZR-5 Concept
 GMC Yukon 4Sight Concept
 Honda Accessories S2000
 Honda Accessories Civic Si
 Honda Civic Si Adam Saruwatari
 Honda Civic Coupe Concept
 Honda Civic JUN Super Lemon
 Hot Wheels Twin Mill 1:1
 Hummer H1 Alpha Vision Concept
 Hyundai Tiburon GT V6 by APC
 Hyundai Tiburon GT V6 by Hyundai Motor America
 Hyundai Santa Fe Rick's Kustoms "Alter Ego"
 Hyundai Santa Fe by Algonquin
 Hyundai Santa Fe by Mongoose Race Team
 Hyundai LZ 450 Concept
 Isuzu Axiom XSF Concept
 Isuzu ARB Project Compass Trooper
 Isuzu Clipper Blue Rodeo
 Jaguar XKR-R Performance Prototype
 Jeep Cherokee Pro Comp
 Jeep Grand Cherokee Overland
 Jeep Liberty "Patriot" Concept
 Jeep Liberty American Edition Concept
 Jeep Liberty "Freedom"
 Jeep Liberty "Indian Woodie"
 Jeep Liberty Mopar
 Jeep Wrangler American Racing Spooner Tuner Concept
 Jeep Wrangler Arb
 Jeep Wrangler Hi-Lift
 Jeep Wrangler Mickey Thompson
 Jeep Wrangler Tye Dye Concept
 Jeep Wrangler Skyjacker Rock Ready
 Jeep Wrangler Ramsey
 Jeep Wrangler Warn Industries
 Jeep Wrangler "Mountain Biker"
 Land Rover Discovery Kalahari Concept
 Land Rover Freelander Supercharged-Performance Callaway
 Lincoln Blackwood "Pegasus"
 Lincoln LS "Sport Edition"
 Mazda Miata Zoomster Concept
 Mazda Protegé5 Troy Lee Designs
 Mercury Marauder
 Mercury Mountaineer Silver Streak
 Mitsubishi Lancer OZ Rally Edition
 Nissan Altima Stillen
 Nissan Frontier Axis Wheels
 Nissan Frontier Art Schmitt Racing
 Nissan NISMO SE-R Concept
 Nissan NISMO Skyline GT-R
 Nissan Jim Wolf Technologies Sentra SE-Turbo
 Nissan NCTNA Project X Xterra
 Nissan Rockford Fosgate Xterra
 Oldsmobile Intrigue 442 Concept
 Pontiac Aztek SRV Concept
 Pontiac Grand Am Hot Wheels Concept
 Pontiac Grand Prix GP40 Concept
 Pontiac Firebird Raptor Concept
 Pontiac Sunfire HO 2.4 Concept
 Pontiac Vibe FX
 Pontiac Vibe GT-R Concept
 Saturn SC2 Turbo Concept
 Saturn SCX Concept
 Toyota TRD Ivan Stewart Signature Edition Tundra
 Toyota Matrix XRS
 Volvo V70 Cross Country Wagon Emphasizing "Rugged Outdoor Versatility"
 Volvo V40 Wagon 1.9T Inspired Dynamism Concept

2002

 Acura CL Type-S Concept
 Acura RSX Type-S Factory Performance Package
 Acura RSX Type-S SCCA Real Time Racing Team
 Cadillac CTSm Concept
 Cadillac DTS Icon Concept
 Cadillac Escalade ESV Platinum Concept
 Cadillac Escalade EXTm Concept
 Chevrolet Camaro Z28 Dragster
 Chevrolet Cavalier 2.2 Turbo Sport Coupe Concept
 Chevrolet Cavalier NHRA Dragster
 Chevrolet Cavalier Z-24 Supercharged Concept
 Chevrolet Cavalier Attitude
 Chevrolet Corvette Z06
 Chevrolet Corvette White Shark Concept
 Chevrolet Express Ultimate Ski Van Concept
 Chevrolet Kodiak Pickup Concept
 Chevrolet Lucchese Suburban Concept
 Chevrolet Monte Carlo Jeff Gordon Edition
 Chevrolet Silverado Extended Cab SS
 Chevrolet Silverado Regular Cab SS
 Chevrolet Silverado Craftsman Pace Truck Concept
 Chevrolet Silverado SST Concept
 Chevrolet Silverado 1500HD Concept by Oakley MX
 Chevrolet Tahoe SS Concept
 Chevrolet Trailblazer SS Concept
 Chevrolet Venture MEV Concept
 Chevrolet Venture Mobility Concept
 Chrysler 300M Special So-Cal Speed Shop
 Chrysler PT Cruiser Big Sky Concept
 Chrysler PT Cruiser Turbo Kenne Bell
 Chrysler PT Super Cruiser Concept
 Chrysler Sebring Convertible Luxury Tuner Concept by Racing Sports Akimoto
 Dodge Charger 'The Fast And The Furious'
 Dodge Grand Caravan Extreme Concept by APC
 Dodge Gifford RAM Recon
 Dodge Neon R/T Compact Performance Concept by Wings West
 Dodge Ram 1500
 Dodge Ram 1500 Handicap Accessible Steve Bucaro
 Dodge Ram 2500 HEMI Kenne-Bell Concept
 Dodge Ram 3500 Cannonball Express Concept by Performance West
 Dodge Stratus Turbo Concept
 GMC Envoy XL Project Pro Concept
 GMC Savana Install Pro Concept
 GMC Sierra Landscaper Pro Concept
 GMC Yukon XL Outdoor Living Pro Concept
 Kia Rio Cinco Swim Concept
 Kia Sorento Surf Concept
 1970 Big Oly Ford Bronco
 Ford No Fear NF-155
 Ford F-150 Himalaya II Concept
 Ford F-150 Eric Clapton Super Street
 Ford F-350 TRENZ Ultimate Mountain Climber
 Ford FR100 Concept
 Ford Competition Orange SVT Focus
 Ford Escape DG Motorsports
 Ford New Dimension Excursion Concept
 Ford Hot Wheels Focus Concept
 Ford Focus Wagon FT230
 Ford SVT Focus European Appearance Package
 Ford SVT Mustang Cobra 10th Anniversary Edition
 Ford Thunderbird by Chip Foose
 Honda AEM Civic Coupe
 Honda Accord Coupe Concept
 Honda Accord Coupe Factory Performance
 Honda Civic Si Concept
 Honda Mugen Civic Si
 Honda Pro Drag Civic Si
 Hummer H2 Upscale Performance Concept
 Hyundai ALT Wheels Tiburon
 Hyundai APC Tiburon
 Hyundai A'PEXi Tiburon
 Hyundai Eibach Tiburon
 Hyundai HKS Tiburon
 Hyundai Import Racer Project Tiburon
 Hyundai Injen Tiburon
 Hyundai Modern Image Tiburon
 Hyundai Motegi Tiburon
 Hyundai Rick Dore XG350
 Hyundai Street Concepts Tiburon
 Hyundai Troy Lee Sonata
 Hyundai Tiburon GT Razzi
 Hyundai Tiburon GT Shark Racing
 Jaguar X-Type Racing Concept
 Jeep Liberty "Tactical Transport" by Performance West
 Jeep Liberty "Concept KJ" by Mopar Accessories/Decoma SVE
 Jeep Wrangler "Surf & Turf" by Performance West
 Jeep Wrangler Scrambler "Brute" by AEV
 Land Rover Freelander G4 Challenge
 Lincoln Navigator Sean John
 Mazda 6 Troy Lee
 Mazda MazdaSpeed Protege
 Mitsubishi STAGE 1 Eclipse
 Nissan Axis Sport Tuning 350Z Concept
 Nissan NISMO 350Z Concept Le Mans Sunset
 Nissan NISMO 350Z Concept Silverstone
 Nissan Stillen Altima Concept
 Nissan Street Concepts Sentra SE-R
 Nissan SE-R Spec V Speed Channel World Challenge Race Car
 Pontiac Bonneville GXP Show Car
 Pontiac Grand Am GXP Show Car
 Pontiac Grand Prix GXP Show Car
 Pontiac Sunfire American Tuner Show Car
 Pontiac Sunfire GXP Show Car
 Pontiac Sunfire NHRA Dragster
 Pontiac Vibe GXP Show Car
 Pontiac Vibe SPO Supercharged Show Car
 Saturn ION-EFX Concept
 Saturn ION-Tour Concept
 Saturn VUE Active Expression Limited Edition
 Scion xB Motegi
 Scion xB Paisley
 Scion xB Stewart Concept
 Suzuki/MA Audio Aerio SX Sport Concept

2003

 Acura NSX by Duke Tubtim
 Acura TL A-Spec Concept
 Acura TSX A-Spec Concept
 Skunk2 Acura RSX Racecar
 Buick Rainier TW Edition Concept
 Buick Rendezvous Ultra TW Edition Concept
 Jay Leno Buick Roadmaster
 Cadillac DeVille Armored Edition
 Cadillac SRX Black Diamond Concept
 Cadillac CTS Sport Concept
 Cadillac Escalade ESV Executive Edition Concept
 Chevrolet Aveo Xtreme Concept
 Chevrolet Cavalier Partner Vehicle
 Chevrolet Colorado Extreme Concept
 Chevrolet Colorado Z71 Vision Concept
 Chevrolet Equinox Xtreme Concept
 Chevrolet Malibu Xtreme Concept
 Chevrolet Police Tahoe
 Chevrolet Silverado Z71 Crew Cab 4x4 Concept
 Chevrolet Silverado Z71 Extended 4x4 Concept
 Chevrolet Silverado Crew Cab Cargo/Troop Carrier
 Chevrolet TrailBlazer Z71 4x4 Concept
 Chevrolet Suburban Partner Vehicle
 Chevrolet Super Stepside Custom Concept
 Chrysler California Kid Prowler
 Chrysler Pacifica Santa Monica Concept
 Chrysler PT Coupe Concept
 Chrysler Pteazer Roadster Concept
 Chrysler Sebring Special Concept
 Dodge Ram High Output 1500 Sportside
 Dodge Neon SRT-4 Extreme Concept
 Dodge Viper SRT-10 Carbon Concept
 Ford Focus Performance 5-door Concept
 Ford Focus 3-door Performance Concept
 Ford Focus Roush
 Ford Focus RS8 Performance Project
 Ford Ranger Performance Concept
 Ford FR100 Panel Truck Concept
 Ford Mustang Fastback Concept
 Ford Mustang Mach 1 Racer by MRT
 Ford F-150 American Muscle by Street Scene
 Ford F-150 Big Sky by Performance West
 Ford F-150 Bonspeed Banshee
 Ford F-150 Canyon Crawler by X-Treme Toys
 Ford F-150 Everest by Prefix
 Ford F-150 by Foose Design
 Ford F-150 LSC (Low, Smooth, Cool) by Air Ri
 Ford F-150 Fast and Ferocious by Wings West
 Ford Iron Man F-150 by DeBerti Designs
 Ford Roush F-150
 Ford F-150 SCOUT by BFS Mobility
 Ford Shine F-150 by So-Cal Speed Shop
 Ford F-150 Stainless by Classic Design Concepts
 Ford Super Wagons F-150 by Hulst Customs
 GMC Canyon Crew Cab AT4 Concept
 GMC Envoy XUV AT4 Concept
 GMC Sierra Crew Cab Short Box AT4 Concept
 GMC Sierra Partner Vehicle
 GMC Yukon AT4 Concept
 Honda AEM/DriverFX.com Civic
 Honda Element Concept
 Honda Civic Coupe Factory Performance Package
 Honda S2000 King Motorsports Mugen
 Hyundai Elantra GT Wicked Sedan by American Pro
 Hyundai Santa Fe by K-Daddyz Kustomz
 Hyundai Santa Fe by Street Concepts
 Hyundai Santa Fe by Troy Lee Designs
 Hyundai Santa Fe by Modern ImageSignworks
 Hyundai Sonata LX by Rick Dore Kustoms
 Hyundai Tiburon by AME Marketing
 Hyundai Tiburon by American Products Company
 Hyundai Tiburon by Modern ImageSignworks
 Hyundai Tiburon by Street Concepts
 Hyundai XG350L by J & A Autosport
 Hummer H1
 Hummer H2 SUT Dirt Sports Concept
 Jeep Liberator CRD Diesel Concept
 Land Rover Defender 110 CKD
 Lexus Blitz SC430
 Lexus IS 430 Project Concept
 Lincoln Kenny Brown Aviator by Kenny Brown Perf
 Lincoln LS by Rick Dore Kustoms
 Lincoln Navigator Blackhawk by Works Power
 Lincoln Town Car by So-Cal Speed Shop
 Mazda Mazdaspeed MX-5 Miata
 Mazda Mazdaspeed RX-8
 Mazda MX-5 Miata by DG Motorsports
 Mercury Marauder "Street Stalker" by Paul?s Hig
 Mercury XR Mountaineer by LA West
 Mitsubishi Eclipse Racecar by Automotive Designs
 Mitsubishi Endeavor by Ballistic Unlimited
 Mitsubishi Endeavor by Classic Soft Trim
 Mitsubishi Endeavor by Import Access.net
 Mitsubishi Lancer Evolution RS
 Mitsubishi Lancer Evolution by Bozz Performance
 Mitsubishi Lancer Evolution by Toda Racing
 Mitsubishi Road Race Evolution Project Car
 Mitsubishi Spyder GTS by R-1 Racing Sports
 Mitsubishi Street Concepts Evolution
 Mitsubishi Yokohama Advan Evolution
 Nissan Altima by Fesler
 Nissan Maxima by Kenny's Garage
 Nissan Maxima by Stillen
 Nissan Maxima by Street Concepts
 Nissan Murano by Custom Shop
 Nissan Pathfinder Armada by Axis Sport Tuning
 Nissan Pathfinder Armada by Creative Development
 Nissan Pathfinder Armada by Modern Image
 Nissan Pathfinder Armada by Rytec
 Nissan NISMO 350Z
 Nissan NISMO Altima
 Nissan NISMO Sentra SE-R
 Nissan Quest by Kenny's Garage
 Nissan Sentra Spec V by American Products Company
 Nissan Titan by Troy Lee
 Nissan Titan by CST
 Nissan Titan by Street Concepts
 Nissan Xterra by Modern Image
 Pontiac American Tuner Sunfire
 Pontiac Grand Am Autocross Concept
 Pontiac Grand Prix Autocross Concept
 Pontiac GTO Autocross Concept
 Pontiac Sunfire Autocross Concept
 Pontiac Vibe Autocross Concept
 Saturn ION Red Line Quad Coupe by SO-CAL Speed Shop
 Saturn VUE Red Line Street Play Concept
 Scion xA by L.J. Garcia
 Subaru Impreza WRX by Easy Street Motorsports
 Toyota Corolla XR-S
 Toyota Supercharged TRD Matrix

2004
 Mercury Mariner "Urban Edition" Concept
Pontiac GXP concept

2005

 Cadillac CTS-V "European Killer"
 1968 Chevrolet Camaro Convertible Green Ice
 1969 Chevrolet Camaro "The Great American Supercar"
 1971 Chevrolet Chevelle SS Detroit Locker LSS2
 Chevrolet Cobalt SS Import Killer
 Chevrolet Colorado Yamahauler
 Chevrolet Corvette Stuf Corvette
 Chevrolet HHR “Heartbeat Hot Rod”
 Chevrolet Silverado 3500 4x4 Dually Crew Cab "Born To Tow"
 Chrysler KICKER Crossfire
 Dodge Cummins 2500 4x4 Tyler Walker Race Truck
 1970 Dodge Dart Swinger "The Poison Dart"
 1971 Dodge Challenger Big Dawg
 Ford F-150 Water Search And Rescue
 Ford F-150 XLT Regular Cab Red Thunder
 Ford F-250 Crew Cab Joyride
 Ford F-250 4x4 Crew Cab Short Bed The “GC” (General Contractor)
 Ford Focus ZX3 Little Red
 Ford E350 Van Sportsmobile's Ultimate Adventure Vehicle
 Ford Explorer Northern Edition
 Ford Mustang California Dreamer
 Ford Mustang GT Convertible “California Dream”
 Ford Mustang Woodward GT
 Ford Ranger STX Zero Gravity-Go After It!
 GMC Grand Canyon
 GMC Sierra Crew Cab Artic Stealth
 Hummer H1 Raptor 2001
 Hummer H2 Duramax Conversion
 Hyundai Tiburon Red Flyer by Street Concepts
 Infiniti G35 Racing Revolution
 Infiniti M35 xM
 Jeep Buggy Custom
 Jeep Sahara State-Of-The-Art TJ
 Jeep Wrangler Rubicon Project Lock It Up
 Troy Lee Designs MX-5
 Nissan 350Z Top Gun Kit
 Nissan Frontier Crew Cab 4WD Impulse Beach Breaker Watch
 Nissan Rock'd Frontier
 Pontiac G6 Afterburn
 Pontiac Solstice Weekend Club Racer concept
 Scion xB “TWINS”
 Subaru WRX PERRIN H6 STI
 Toyota Tacoma 2WD PreRunner
 Toyota Tacoma Smittybilt Rock Crawler
 Volkswagen Phaeton “Signature Series”

2006

 Chevrolet HHR Panel
 Ford F-150 FX2 Sport Extreme
 Ford F-150 by DeBerti Designs
 Ford F-150 by Bigfoot Offroad & Performance
 Ford F-250 Super Duty Project Work-A-HAUL IT
 Ford F-250 Super Duty by Fabtech
 Ford F-650 by DeBerti Designs
 Ford Fusion T5 by MRT
 Ford All-American Grand Touring Fusion
 Ford Edge by H&R Special Springs
 Ford Edge by 3dCarbon
 Ford Expedition Funkmaster Flex Concept
 Ford Explorer Sport "Muscle Truck" Barry's Speed Shop
 Ford Project Mustang GT by Ford Vehicle Personalization
 Ford Mustang GT Convertible by Stitchcraft Interiors Inc.
 Ford Mustang GT Drop Top by K-daddyz Kustomz
 1970 Ford Mustang Boss 302
 Ford Mustang GT
 Ford Explorer Sport Trac Super Muscle Truck
 HR+R JDRF Charity Car
 Lincoln Navigator by Galpin Auto Sports
 Lincoln Navigator by Exotic Cars
 Lincoln MKX by 3dCarbon
 Lincoln MKZ by 3dCarbon
 Mitsubishi Evolander Concept
 Panoz Esperante GTLM
 Pontiac Solstice GXP-R concept
 Pontiac Solstice SD-290 race concept
 “RUSH” by Kirkham Motorsports
 Shelby GT500 40th Anniversary
 Shelby GT500 Dragster
 Suzuki XL-7 BaseCamp Concept
 Suzuki SX4 "Zuk" Concept
 Suzuki Thunderhill SX4 GodZUKI
 The Stallion Trike
 Volvo Caresto V-8 Speedster Concept
 Volvo C30 by Evolve
 Volvo C30 by IPD 
 Volvo C30 HEICO Sportiv
 1967 Volvo Amazon Kombi-69

2007 

 Chevrolet HHR SS Panel concept
 Ford Mustang V6 Appearance Package
 Honda HF-S concept
 Toyota Matrix (second generation)

2008 

 Chevrolet Camaro LS7
 Chevrolet Dale Earnhardt Jr. Camaro
 Chevrolet Camaro Black
 2010 Chevrolet Camaro GS Racecar Concept
 Hyundai RMR "Art of Speed" Genesis Coupe 2.0t
 Mercedes-Benz GLK 350 Urban Whip
 Mercedes-Benz GLK 320 Brabus Widestar
 Mercedes-Benz GLK 350 RennTech Rally Racer
 Mercedes-Benz GLK 350 Four Corners Rock Crawler
 Pontiac Solstice GXP Coupe concept
 Subaru Forester XTI concept
 Subaru Forester Mountain Rescue Vehicle
 Volkswagen Jetta TDI Cup "Street" edition

2009 

 Chevrolet Synergy Camaro
 Chevrolet Chroma Camaro
 Chevrolet Camaro Dusk
 Jay Leno Camaro
 Hyundai Genesis Coupe 2.0T R-Spec (2009–)
 Hyundai RM460 Genesis Coupe

2010 

 RMR Signature Edition Hyundai Equus
 DUB Edition Hyundai Equus
 Mazda MX-5 Super20

2011 

 Hyundai RM500 Genesis Coupe
 ARK Performance Veloster
 PM Lifestyle Veloster
 Hyundai Re:Mix Music Veloster
 Hyundai Re:Mix Gaming Veloster
 RMR Global Rallycross Veloster
 Mazda Turbo2
 3dCarbon Mazda2 
 Mazda MX-5 Spyder
 Mazda MX-5 Super20 (refresh)

2012 

 Dodge Charger Juiced
 Ford Mustang High Gear concept
 Cosworth Hyundai Genesis Racing Series
 Hyundai Genesis Coupe R-Spec by ARK
 Hyundai Veloster Velocity
 ARK Performance Veloster Alpine Edition
 Hyundai Veloster JP Edition
 Scion Carbon Stealth FR-S
 Scion FR-S GT
 Scion Minty FReSh
 Toyota Avalon TRD Edition 
 Toyota Avalon HV Edition
 Toyota Avalon DUB Edition
 Toyota FJ-S Cruiser Concept

2013

 Acura RLX Urban Luxury Sedan by MAD Industries
 Acura RLX VIP Sedan by Evasive Motorsports
 Acura Street Performance ILX by MAD Industries
 AEV Ram 2500 Crew Cab Diesel Concept
 Chevrolet Camaro Spring Special Edition
 Chevrolet Camaro RRTP Customs Wide-Body
 Chevrolet Performance Camaro V6
 Chevrolet Performance Camaro V8
 Chevrolet COPO Camaro Concept
 Chevrolet Garage Camaro Concept
 Chevrolet Corvette Concept 7 Nowicki Autosport
 Chevrolet Corvette Stingray Convertible Atlantic Concept
 Chevrolet Corvette Stingray “Gran Turismo” Concept
 Chevrolet Corvette Stingray Pacific Concept
 Chevrolet Corvette Stingray LG Motorsports
 Chevrolet Corvette Stingray PFADT Race Engineering
 Chevrolet Malibu LTZ Concept
 Chevrolet Personalization Sonic Concept
 Chevrolet Performance Sonic RS Concept
 Chevrolet Performance Classic Truck Concept
 Chevrolet Signature Silverado by Brad Paisley Concept
 Chevrolet Silverado Black Ops Concept
 Chevrolet Silverado Cheyenne Concept
 Chevrolet Silverado Volunteer Firefighter Concept
 Chevrolet Silverado Z71 by Tony Stewart Concept
 Chevrolet Silverado HD Dually Tow Vehicle
 Chevrolet Suburban Half-Pipe Concept
 Chevrolet Ricky Carmichael All-Activity Sonic Concept
 Chevrolet Spark EV Tech Performance Concept
 Chevrolet Jeff Gordon SS Performance
 Chevrolet Tahoe Black Concept
 Chevrolet Tahoe Police Concept
 Chevrolet Urban Cool Impala Concept
 Chrysler 300 Convertible by JC Autostyles
 Chrysler 300S Mopar
 Chrysler 300S Phantom Black
 Dodge Challenger R/T Shaker
 Dodge Challenger Mopar ’14
 Dodge Challenger R/T "Scat Package"
 Dodge Charger R/T "Scat Package"
 Dodge Dart GT "Scat Package"
 Dodge Durango R/T Mopar
 Ferrari 458 Liberty Walk Wide-Body
 Fiat 500L Adventurer
 Ford-Riley Daytona Prototype
 1956 Ford Thunderbird “Men of Honor”
 Ford F-100 'Snakebit'
 Ford F-150 by Fatal Clothing
 Ford F-150 by JR Consulting
 Ford F-150 by Skyjacker Suspensions
 Ford F-350 Super Duty by Cars by Kris
 Ford F-250 Super Duty by Hulst Customs
 Ford Bronco Build-a-Bronco Four-Door
 Ford Fiesta ST by 3dCarbon
 Ford Fiesta ST by Bojix Design
 Ford Fiesta ST by COBB Tuning and Tanner Foust Racing
 Ford Fiesta ST by Ice Nine Group
 Ford Fiesta ST by MRT
 Ford Focus ST by Cosworth
 Ford Focus ST by European Car Magazine
 Ford Focus ST by DRAGG
 Ford Focus ST by Green Filter USA
 Ford Focus ST by PM Lifestyle
 Ford Focus ST by UTI Gulf Racing
 Ford Fusion Titanium by DSO Eyewear
 Ford Fusion by Full-Race Motorsports
 Ford Mustang 50th Anniversary Golf Cart
 Ford Mustang by Hollywood Hot Rods
 Ford Mustang by Nitto Tire
 Ford Mustang by Vortech Superchargers
 Ford Mustang GT Project Yellow Jacket
 Ford Transit Connect by Blood & Grease
 Ford Transit Connect by CGS Motorsports
 Ford Transit Connect by eJudged.com
 Ford Transit Connect by Impulse Marketing & Media
 Ford Transit Connect by K-Daddyz Kustomz
 Ford Transit Connect by LGE-CTS Motorsports
 Ford Transit Connect by Mobsteel
 Ford Transit Connect by Pentech Automotive
 Ford Transit Connect by Strange Motion BMX
 Ford Transit Connect by Hot Wheels
 Forgiato Widebody C7 Corvette Stingray by TS Designs
 Giovanna Wheels Cadillac Escalade Golf Cart
 Honda Accord by MAD Industries
 Honda Civic Coupe
 Honda Civic Coupe HGA Package
 Honda Civic Si Coupe
 Honda Civic Si Coupe Race Car by HPD
 Honda Civic Si Sedan SEMA Project
 Honda Civic Street Performance Concept by HPD
 Honda Mean Mower
 Honda Odyssey by Bisimoto Engineering
 Hot Rod Conspiracy's Castrol Rocket
 Bisimoto Engineering Hyundai Genesis Coupe
 Hyundai Genesis Coupe JP Edition
 Hyundai Genesis Coupe Legato ARK Performance Concept
 Hyundai Veloster Turbo by Fox Marketing
 Hyundai Veloster Turbo Night Racer "Yellowcake" by EGR
 Jeep Cherokee Trail Carver
 Jeep Wrangler Copper Crawler Concept
 Kia Amped Soul
 Kia DJ Booth Soul
 Kia Music Memorabilia Soul
 Kia The Voice Soul
 Kia Vans Warped Tour Soul
 Lexus IS 250 by Andrew Atigehchi
 Lexus IS 250 AWD by Gordon Ting
 Lexus IS 250 F-Sport by Paul Tolson and Gabriel Escobedo
 Lexus IS 300 by Maricar Cortez
 Lexus IS 340 by Philip Chase
 Lexus IS 350 F-Sport by Seibon Carbon
 Lexus IS 350 F-Sport by Vossen Wheels
 Lexus IS 350 F-Sport by Rob Evans/ VIP Auto Salon
 Lexus LFA by Guy S. De Alwis
 Mazda Ceramic 6 Concept
 Mazda Club Sport 3 Concept
 Mazda Club Sport 6 Concept
 Mazda Vector 3 Concept
 Maximum D Monster Truck
 Mobsteel FedEx Delivery Truck
 Mopar 4700 Spec Class 4x4
 Porsche 911 RAUH-Welt
 Porsche Cayenne Turbo Black Bison by Wald International
 Ram 1500 Sun Chaser
 Ram Dually Case Work Truck
 Ring Brothers 1971 DeTomaso Pantera
 Scion GReddy Performance x Scion Racing Drift FR-S
 Scion Steve Aoki x Scion FR-S
 Scion FR-S Style J/Urban GT Sport Coupe
 Scion Bulletproof FR-S Concept One
 Scion Walter Franco L-DZ Concept
 Scion Young Tea Simpli-tC
 Scion Josh Croll WSD-tC
 Scion Strictly Business Cartel Scion xB
 Toyota 4Runner Ultimate Dream Ski
 Toyota Camry "CamRally"
 Toyota Corolla "Crusher"
 Toyota FJ Cruiser "Trail Teams Ultimate"
 Toyota RAV4 LifeTime Fitness
 Toyota SpongeBob Highlander: Tanked Edition
 Toyota Tacoma DC Shoes
 Toyota Tundra "Let's Go Moto"
 Toyota Tundra BBQ
 Vaydor
 Volkswagen Golf by H&R
 Volkswagen Jetta GLI Helios Special Edition Tribute by FMS Automotive
 Volkswagen Jetta Racer's Dream by FMS Automotive

 Jeep 4x4 TEXON
Concept on 4x4 by SG Concepts

2014 

 Kia Smitten Soul EV
 Lexus IS 350 F Sport Deviantart Edition
 Scion FR-S T1

2016 

 Toyota Yaris Legian
 Toyota Land Speed Cruiser
 Toyota Prius G

2017 

 Chevrolet Camaro Hot Wheels Special Edition
 Luke Bryan Chevrolet Suburban concept

2019 

 Hyundai Veloster Grappler concept

2022
 Dodge Charger Daytona SRT
 Volkswagen Golf MK3 “Rallye”

SEMA awards
Since 2003, the GT awards have been presented at the SEMA Auto Convention, and these include categories such as Best in Show, Best Hot Rod, and Best European Import. SEMA was also presented with the Grassroots Motorsports Editors' Choice Award in 2012.

SEMA Action Network
Since 1997, the SEMA Action Network (SAN) has been a grassroots network for the automotive hobby. The SEMA Action Network is a partnership between enthusiasts, vehicle clubs and members of the specialty automotive parts industry in the United States and Canada who have collaborated to promote automotive hobby-friendly legislation and laws.

In the past, the SAN has:
 Promoted street rod and custom vehicle (including kit cars and replicas) registration and titling laws in over 20 states
 Assisted in protecting classic vehicles waiting to be restored from confiscation on private property
 Defended legal off-road nitrous oxide use with SAN model legislation
 Defended enthusiast's right to use aftermarket exhaust systems
 Opposed “Cash for Clunkers” legislation
 Promoted legislation to lower taxes and fees for hobbyist vehicles
 Advocated to ensure public lands remain open to responsible off-road recreation

See also
 Aftermarket exhaust parts
 Clean Air Act, Warranty Provisions (42 U.S.C. S 7541 (C) (3) (B))
 Magnuson-Moss Warranty Act
 SFI Foundation, formerly known as SEMA Foundation, Inc., an offspring from SEMA

References

External links
 Official SEMA website
 Official SEMA Show website
 Official SEMA Ignited - The Official SEMA Show After Party Website
 Official SEMA Hall of Fame website
 Official SEMA digital media site
 Automotive Aftermarket Industry Week
 History of SEMA
 SEMA Action Network website
 Clean Air Act Warranty Provisions (42 U.S.C. S 7541 (C) (3) (B)).

Automotive industry